Dharti TV  Television Network (Dharti TV) is the first private   TV channel. This Channel is general entertainment Channel which covers Dramas, News, Music and Current Affairs. Fazul Samejo, is the chief reporter at Dharti TV. Mr. Samejo is known for his aggressive style in obtaining stories while maintaining objectivity.  His contract was scheduled to end December 31, 2015, however as of mid-January, 2016, he remains with the station.

See also
 Sindh
 Sindhi language
 Sindhi music videos
 Fazul Samejo

References

Television stations in Pakistan
Television channels and stations established in 2008
Television networks in Pakistan
Television stations in Karachi
Sindhi-language mass media